The Minsk Blitz was the heavy bombing of the city of Minsk (population was 270,000), the capital of the Byelorussian Soviet Socialist Republic within the Soviet Union during the Second World War. On 24 June 1941, three waves of German Luftwaffe bombers, 47 aircraft each, bombed Minsk. The Soviet anti-aircraft defense of the city was poorly organized, and panic ensued. Because the water supply was destroyed, fires could not be put down, and the city was evacuated.

As much as 85% of the city's buildings and the entire infrastructure was destroyed. More than 1,000 people were killed.

See also
German occupation of Byelorussia during World War II

External links 
 Article in newspaper - in Russian
 Video of the bombing, fire and ruins (as part of multimedia presentation)
 Minsk. City of Foreign Sun (Мінск. Горад чужога сонца). Belsat. 

Minsk
Military history of Belarus during World War II
History of Minsk
Minsk
20th century in Minsk
Minsk